Roberto Ledesma (La Habana, 24 June 1924) is a Cuban-born bolero singer who emigrated to the United States in 1960. Among his well-known recordings is a version of "Son de la Loma".

References in

1924 births
Living people
Cuban emigrants to the United States